Charanon Ki Saugandh is a 1988 Indian Hindi-language film directed by K. Bapaiah, starring Mithun Chakraborty, Amrita Singh, Nirupa Roy, Prem Chopra, Kader Khan, Shakti Kapoor, Raj Kiran. The film was a remake of Tamil film Savaale Samali.

Plot

Charanon Ki Saugandh is an action drama, featuring Mithun Chakraborty and Amrita Singh , well supported by Nirupa Roy, Prem Chopra, Shakti Kapoor, Kader Khan and Raj Kiran.

Cast

 Mithun Chakraborty as Ravi 
 Amrita Singh as Kanchan Singh
 Nirupa Roy as Ravi's Mother
 Shreeram Lagoo as Govind (Ravi's Father)
 Prem Chopra as Thakur Singh
 Shakti Kapoor as Shakti Singh 
 Kader Khan as Chandi Das 
 Rameshwari as Laxmi (Ravi's Sister)
 Raj Kiran as Laxmi's husband  
 Asrani as Loban
 Sushma Seth as Padma Singh
 Shoma Anand as Geeta (ChandiDas's sister)
 Satyendra Kapoor

Music
"Nariyan Shaher Ki Nariyan" - Kishore Kumar, Alka Yagnik
"Chaand Gagan Se Phool Chaman Se" - Mohammed Aziz
"Ek Rawan Ko Ram Ne Maara" - Kishore Kumar
"Chal Sair Gulshan Ki Tujh Ko Karaoon" - Kishore Kumar, Alka Yagnik
"Aaja Aaja Mere Mithu Miyan" - Alka Yagnik

References

External links
 
 http://ibosnetwork.com/asp/filmbodetails.asp?id=Charnon+Ki+Saugandh

1988 films
1980s Hindi-language films
1988 drama films
Indian drama films
Films directed by K. Bapayya
Films scored by Laxmikant–Pyarelal
Hindi remakes of Tamil films
Hindi-language drama films